The Spain national futsal team represents Spain in international futsal competitions and is controlled by the Royal Spanish Football Federation. It is one of the strongest teams in the World, seven times champions in the UEFA Futsal Championship, and the two times consecutive champions of the FIFA Futsal World Cup.

It has been proclaimed world champion in 2000 and 2004, and three times runner-up in 1996, 2008 and 2012.

At the continental level of UEFA competitions, it has participated in the eleven disputed editions of the UEFA Futsal Championship, of which was organizer in the first two, of 1996 and 1999. It has been continental champion seven times, in 1996, 2001, 2005, 2007, 2010, 2012 and 2016, being runner-up in 1999 and 2018, not reaching the final only in the editions of 2003 and 2014, where it was eliminated in the semifinals.

These titles make Spain the second most successful national team after Brazil.

Results and fixtures
The following is a list of match results in the last 12 months, as well as any future matches that have been scheduled.
Legend

2021

Coaching staff

Current coaching staff
Head coach – Fede Vidal

Players

Current squad
The following players were called up to the squad for the UEFA 2024 FIFA Futsal World Cup qualification match against Cyprus and Moldova on 1 and 8 March 2023, respectively.
Head coach: Fede Vidal

Recent call-ups
The following players have also been called up to the squad within the last 12 months.

COV Player withdrew from the squad due to contracting COVID-19.
INJ Player withdrew from the squad due to an injury.
PRE Preliminary squad.
RET Retired from international futsal.

Competitive record

FIFA Futsal World Cup

UEFA Futsal Championship

Grand Prix de Futsal

Confederations Cup

Honours

World achievements
The Spain national futsal team have won two FIFA Futsal World Cups (2000, 2004), appeared in five finals and one third/fourth place playoffs.

European achievements
The Spain national futsal team have won seven UEFA Futsal Championships (1996, 1999, 2005, 2007, 2010, 2012 and 2016), appeared in nine finals and three third/fourth place playoffs.

See also
Futsal in Spain
Spain national football team

References

 
European national futsal teams
National team